North Division High School may refer to:
North Division High School (Chicago)
North Division High School (Milwaukee)